William Vicris Digby Dickinson  (2 November 1889 – 24 November 1948) was a Welsh first-class cricketer and British Army officer.

Honours and awards
4 June 1917 - Captain William Vicris Digby Dickinson, South Wales Borderers was awarded the Military Cross for distinguished service in the field.

References

External links

1889 births
1948 deaths
Cricketers from Swansea
People educated at Eton College
Graduates of the Royal Military College, Sandhurst
South Wales Borderers officers
Welsh cricketers
British Army cricketers
Combined Services cricketers
British Army personnel of World War I
Recipients of the Military Cross
Military personnel from Swansea